Micha Wertheim (born 1972) is a Dutch stand-up comedian and satirist. He has also the author of three children's books.

Career
After finishing his MA in Cultural Sciences Micha Wertheim moved to Amsterdam and started working as a freelance radio producer, writer and comedian. He became a member of the Amsterdam-based Dutch comedy collective Comedytrain in 1998. Playing regularly in Amsterdam comedy theatre Toomler. His one man show won both the jury and the audience award at the 2004 edition of the Leids Cabaret Festival. He has a weerkly column in Vrij Nederland.

References

External links 
  

1972 births
Dutch cabaret performers
Dutch male comedians
Jewish Dutch comedians
Dutch satirists
Jewish male comedians
Living people
People from Groningen (city)